Bârnova is a commune in Iași County, Western Moldavia, Romania, part of the Iași Metropolitan Area. It is composed of six villages: Bârnova, Cercu, Păun, Pietrăria, Todirel and Vișan.

See also
Bârnova Monastery
Trinitas Cross

References

Communes in Iași County
Localities in Western Moldavia